The arrondissement of Châteaudun is an arrondissement of France in the Eure-et-Loir department in the Centre-Val de Loire region. It has 61 communes.

Composition

The communes of the arrondissement of Châteaudun, and their INSEE codes, are:

 Alluyes (28005)
 Baigneaux (28019)
 Bazoches-en-Dunois (28028)
 Bazoches-les-Hautes (28029)
 Bonneval (28051)
 Bouville (28057)
 Brou (28061)
 Bullainville (28065)
 La Chapelle-du-Noyer (28075)
 Châteaudun (28088)
 Cloyes-les-Trois-Rivières (28103)
 Commune nouvelle d'Arrou (28012)
 Conie-Molitard (28106)
 Cormainville (28108)
 Courbehaye (28114)
 Dambron (28121)
 Dampierre-sous-Brou (28123)
 Dancy (28126)
 Dangeau (28127)
 Donnemain-Saint-Mamès (28132)
 Flacey (28153)
 Fontenay-sur-Conie (28157)
 Le Gault-Saint-Denis (28176)
 Gohory (28182)
 Guillonville (28190)
 Jallans (28198)
 Logron (28211)
 Loigny-la-Bataille (28212)
 Lumeau (28221)
 Marboué (28233)
 Meslay-le-Vidame (28246)
 Moléans (28256)
 Montboissier (28259)
 Montharville (28260)
 Moriers (28270)
 Mottereau (28272)
 Neuvy-en-Dunois (28277)
 Nottonville (28283)
 Orgères-en-Beauce (28287)
 Péronville (28296)
 Poupry (28303)
 Pré-Saint-Évroult (28305)
 Pré-Saint-Martin (28306)
 Saint-Avit-les-Guespières (28326)
 Saint-Christophe (28329)
 Saint-Denis-Lanneray (28334)
 Saint-Maur-sur-le-Loir (28353)
 Sancheville (28364)
 Saumeray (28370)
 Terminiers (28382)
 Thiville (28389)
 Tillay-le-Péneux (28390)
 Trizay-lès-Bonneval (28396)
 Unverre (28398)
 Varize (28400)
 Vieuvicq (28409)
 Villampuy (28410)
 Villemaury (28330)
 Villiers-Saint-Orien (28418)
 Vitray-en-Beauce (28419)
 Yèvres (28424)

History

The arrondissement of Châteaudun was created in 1800.

As a result of the reorganisation of the cantons of France which came into effect in 2015, the borders of the cantons are no longer related to the borders of the arrondissements. The cantons of the arrondissement of Châteaudun were, as of January 2015:
 Bonneval
 Brou
 Châteaudun
 Cloyes-sur-le-Loir
 Orgères-en-Beauce

References

Chateaudun